Tilt Cove is a town located southeast of Baie Verte on Notre Dame Bay and was founded in 1813. With an official population of 5 at the 2021 census, Tilt Cove is known as "Canada's smallest town." A source of gold, copper, and zinc ores, Tilt Cove was the site of the first mine in Newfoundland. The Tilt Cove mine opened in 1864 and "was soon employing several hundred men at good wages". Postal service was established in 1869.

The population was 1,370 in 1901 but had fallen to 57 by 1956.

History
Settled around 1813 or earlier by George and Mary Winsor from Plymouth (West Country, England), Tilt Cove was a tiny fishing settlement with a population of about 25. In 1857, Smith McKay discovered rich deposits of copper ore and in 1864, in conjunction with C.F. Bennett, he began mining operations. In the 1880s, the Tilt Cove mine changed ownership to the Cape Copper Company. In 1916, the population peaked to 1500.

In 1892, a reporter for the Newfoundland Colonist, described Tilt Cove as "the leading town in Notre Dame Bay, with the sides, top and bottom of the mines being one solid mass of copper, looking as if it would be everlasting". On the afternoon at approximately tea-time on 11 March 1912, there was an avalanche at Tilt Cove, with 5 injuries and 5 fatalities. The funerals took place on 14 March 1912.

The town was once very prosperous but there was a time, like now, when it was not. In 1920 the mines closed and the population dropped to around 100, remaining that way until the mines reopened in 1957 by Canadian mining promoter Matthew James Boylen. Boylen responded to a provincial government policy to encourage mineral exploration and revitalize mining communities and thus, Tilt Cove experienced a rebirth. Ten years later, in 1967 the mines closed down not to re-open for another generation.

Recent mining activity

On 7 July 1999, Cabo Mining entered into an agreement with the Tilt Cove Mining Company, resulting in Cabo Mining acquiring a 100% interest in the Tilt Cove property subject to a 3% NSR by paying a combination of shares and 1.27 million Canadian dollars to Tilt Cove.

On 23 May 2008, surface sampling returned gold and copper assays (up to 69.39 g/t and 10.4% respectively) from surface grab samples.

The current owner of the Tilt Cove mine is Metals Creek, which negotiated terms to process surface material remaining at Tilt Cove: "Transportation of the Tilt Cove stockpile to the Nugget Pond Mill began on June 7th, 2011 with subsequent processing of the ore beginning on June 10th, 2011. 20,882 wet metric tonnes of material was processed at a grade of 1.79 g/t gold. This processing resulted in a $173,372 Net smelter return payment from Rambler Mining to Metals Creek Resources as well as roughly 20,000 to 30,000 tonnes of material still remaining in the stockpile." Ongoing work was in progress to produce a 3D model of the Tilt Cove Mine in 2014.

Demographics 

Attractions
The Queen of Swansea Memorial was erected in Tilt Cove in memory of the passengers and crew who perished on Gull Island following the 1867 sinking of the vessel Queen of Swansea, the ship which transported copper ore from Tilt Cove to Wales.

A resident maintains  a small museum about Tilt Cove's history in his home.

See also
List of cities and towns in Newfoundland and Labrador

References

Further reading
  (bound),  (pbk.)

External links
Geologic Summary and Prospector's Report

Populated coastal places in Canada
Towns in Newfoundland and Labrador
Populated places established in 1813
Mining communities in Newfoundland and Labrador